László Rasztotzky is a Hungarian sprint canoer who competed from the early 1980s. He won a bronze medal in the K-4 10000 m event at the 1982 ICF Canoe Sprint World Championships in Belgrade.

References

Hungarian male canoeists
Living people
Year of birth missing (living people)
ICF Canoe Sprint World Championships medalists in kayak
20th-century Hungarian people